Trumpington is a historic home located at Rock Hall, Kent County, Maryland.  Its Georgian plan main house is of Flemish bond brick construction five bays long, two rooms deep, and two and a half stories high. A -story brick wing is attached. Also on the property is a log plank meathouse, a 19th-century granary, a small cemetery, a 20th-century barn, and mid-20th-century frame cottage.

The house was listed on the National Register of Historic Places in 1980.

References

External links
, including photo from 1977, at Maryland Historical Trust

Houses in Kent County, Maryland
Houses on the National Register of Historic Places in Maryland
Georgian architecture in Maryland
National Register of Historic Places in Kent County, Maryland